John Francis Lander (9 December 1918 – 26 May 2002) was an Australian rules footballer who played with North Melbourne in the Victorian Football League (VFL).

Notes

External links 

1918 births
2002 deaths
North Melbourne Football Club players
Australian rules footballers from Victoria (Australia)